In mathematics, a gerbe is a construct in homological algebra and topology. Gerbes were introduced by Jean Giraud  following ideas of Alexandre Grothendieck as a tool for non-commutative cohomology in degree 2. They can be seen as an analogue of fibre bundles where the fibre is the classifying stack of a group. Gerbes provide a convenient, if highly abstract, language for dealing with many types of deformation questions especially in modern algebraic geometry. In addition, special cases of gerbes have been used more recently in differential topology and differential geometry to give alternative descriptions to certain cohomology classes and additional structures attached to them.

"Gerbe" is a French (and archaic English) word that literally means wheat sheaf.

Definitions

Gerbes on a topological space

As principal bundles glue together (satisfy the descent condition), these groupoids form a stack. The trivial bundle  shows that the local non-emptiness condition is satisfied, and finally as principal bundles are locally trivial, they become isomorphic when restricted to sufficiently small open sets; thus the transitivity condition is satisfied as well.

Gerbes on a site 
The most general definition of gerbes are defined over a site. Given a site  a -gerbe  is a category fibered in groupoids  such that

 There exists a refinement  of  such that for every object  the associated fibered category  is non-empty
 For every  any two objects in the fibered category  are locally isomorphic
Note that for a site  with a final object , a category fibered in groupoids  is a -gerbe admits a local section, meaning satisfies the first axiom, if .

Motivation for gerbes on a site 
Meaning, we are gluing together the groups via some one cocycle. Gerbes are a technical response for this question: they give geometric representations of elements in the higher cohomology group . It is expected this intuition should hold for higher gerbes.

Cohomological classification 
One of the main theorems concerning gerbes is their cohomological classification whenever they have automorphism groups given by a fixed sheaf of abelian groups , called a band. For a gerbe  on a site , an object , and an object , the automorphism group of a gerbe is defined as the automorphism group . Notice this is well defined whenever the automorphism group is always the same.

For example, in topology, many examples of gerbes can be constructed by considering gerbes banded by the group . In addition, the non-torsion classes are represented as infinite-dimensional principal bundles  of the projective group of unitary operators on a fixed infinite dimensional separable Hilbert space . Note this is well defined because all separable Hilbert spaces are isomorphic to the space of square-summable sequences .

Examples

C*-algebras 
There are natural examples of Gerbes which arise from studying the algebra of compactly supported complex valued functions on a paracompact space pg 3. Given a cover  of  there is the Cech groupoid defined aswith source and target maps given by the inclusionsand the space of composable arrows is justThen a degree 2 cohomology class  is just a mapWe can then form a non-commutative C*-algebra  which is associated to the set of compact supported complex valued functions of the spaceIt has a non-commutative product given bywhere the cohomology class  twists the multiplication of the standard -algebra product.

Algebraic geometry 
Let  be a variety over an algebraically closed field ,  an algebraic group, for example . A G-gerbe over M may be defined in a similar way. It is an Artin stack  with a map , such that locally on M (in étale or fppf topology)  is a direct product . There is no need to impose the compatibility with the group structure in that case since it is covered by the definition of a stack.

From two-term complexes of coherent sheaves 
Every two-term complex of coherent sheaveson a scheme  has a canonical sheaf of groupoids associated to it, where on an open subset  there is a two-term complex of -modulesgiving a groupoid. It has objects given by elements  and a morphism  is given by an element  such thatIn order for this stack to be a gerbe, the cohomology sheaf  must always have a section. This hypothesis implies the category constructed above always has objects. Note this can be applied to the situation of comodules over Hopf-algebroids to construct algebraic models of gerbes over affine or projective stacks (projectivity if a graded Hopf-algebroid is used). In addition, two-term spectra from the stabilization of the derived category of comodules of Hopf-algebroids  with  flat over  give additional models of gerbes which are non-strict.

Moduli stack of stable bundles on a curve 
It has a coarse moduli space , which is a quasiprojective variety. These two moduli problems parametrize the same objects, but the stacky version remembers automorphisms of vector bundles. It turns out that the map  is indeed a -gerbe in the sense above.

Root stacks 
Another class of gerbes can be found using the construction of root stacks. It is constructed as the stacksending an -scheme  to the category whose objects are line bundles of the formand morphisms are commutative diagrams compatible with the isomorphisms . Geometrically, these stacks are formed as the fiber product of stackswhere the vertical map of  comes from the Kummer sequenceThis is because  is the moduli space of line bundles, so the line bundle  corresponds to an object of the category  (considered as a point of the moduli space).

Root stacks with sections 
There is another related construction of root stacks with sections. Given the data above, let  be a section. Then the -th root stack of the pair  is defined as the lax 2-functorsending an -scheme  to the category whose objects line bundles of the formand morphisms are given similarly. These stacks can be constructed very explicitly, and are well understood for affine schemes. In fact, these form the affine models for root stacks with sections. Given an affine scheme , all line bundles are trivial, hence  and any section  is equivalent to taking an element .

Examples throughout algebraic geometry 
These and more general kinds of gerbes arise in several contexts as both geometric spaces and as formal bookkeeping tools:
 Azumaya algebras
 Deformations of infinitesimal thickenings
 Twisted forms of projective varieties
 Fiber functors for motives

Differential geometry
  and -gerbes: Jean-Luc Brylinski's approach

History 

Gerbes first appeared in the context of algebraic geometry. They were subsequently developed in a more traditional geometric framework by Brylinski .  One can think of gerbes as being a natural step in a hierarchy of mathematical objects providing geometric realizations of integral cohomology classes.

A more specialised notion of gerbe was introduced by Murray and called bundle gerbes. Essentially they are a smooth version of abelian gerbes belonging more to the hierarchy starting with principal bundles than sheaves. Bundle gerbes have been used in gauge theory and also string theory. Current work by others is developing a theory of non-abelian bundle gerbes.

See also 
Twisted sheaf
Azumaya algebra
Twisted K-theory
Algebraic stack
Bundle gerbe
String group

References 

.
.

External links

Introductory articles 

 Constructions with Bundle Gerbes - Stuart Johnson
 An Introduction to Gerbes on Orbifolds, Ernesto Lupercio, Bernado Uribe.
 What is a Gerbe?, by Nigel Hitchin in Notices of the AMS
 Bundle gerbes, Michael Murray.

Gerbes in topology 

 Homotopy theory of presheaves of simplicial groupoids, Zhi-Ming Luo

Twisted K-theory 

 Twisted K-theory and K-theory of bundle gerbes
 Twisted Bundles and Twisted K-Theory - Karoubi

Applications in string theory 
Stable Singularities in String Theory - contains examples of gerbes in appendix using the Brauer group
Branes on Group Manifolds, Gluon Condensates, and twisted K-theory
Lectures on Special Lagrangian Submanifolds - Very down-to earth introduction with applications to Mirror symmetry
The basic gerbe over a compact simple Lie group - Gives techniques for describing groups such as the String group as a gerbe

Homological algebra
Sheaf theory